Königstein (Berg) is a mountain of Saxony, southeastern Germany.

Mountains of Saxon Switzerland
Königstein, Saxony
Rock formations of Saxon Switzerland